German submarine U-1014 was a Type VIIC/41 U-boat of Nazi Germany's Kriegsmarine during World War II.

She was ordered on 23 March 1942, and was laid down on 25 March 1943, at Blohm & Voss, Hamburg, as yard number 214. She was launched on 30 January 1944, and commissioned under the command of Oberleutnant zur See Wolfgang Glaser on 14 March 1944.

Design
German Type VIIC/41 submarines were preceded by the heavier Type VIIC submarines. U-1014 had a displacement of  when at the surface and  while submerged. She had two shafts and two  propellers.

U-1014 was fitted with five  torpedo tubes (four fitted at the bow and one at the stern), fourteen torpedoes or 26 TMA or TMB Naval mines, one  SK C/35 naval gun, (220 rounds), one  Flak M42 and two  C/30 anti-aircraft guns. The boat had a complement of between forty-four and fifty-two.

Service history
U-1014 participated in one war patrol. Which resulted in no ships damaged or sunk.

U-1014 rammed , her sister boat, on 19 May 1944, west of Pillau in the Baltic Sea. U-1015 sunk with the loss of 36 of her 40 crewmen.

Two men were killed and three wounded on 16 September 1944, in the harbor of Libau, Latvia, during a Soviet air raid.

U-1014 had Schnorchel underwater-breathing apparatus fitted out before January 1945.

U-1014 was sunk by depth charges in the North Channel, east of Malin Head, with all 48 of her crew.

See also
 Battle of the Atlantic

References

Bibliography

External links

German Type VIIC/41 submarines
U-boats commissioned in 1943
World War II submarines of Germany
1943 ships
Ships built in Hamburg
Maritime incidents in February 1945
U-boats sunk by British warships
U-boats sunk by depth charges